Pleasureville may refer to:

Places and locations
 Pleasureville, Kentucky
 Pleasureville, Pennsylvania
 Pleasureville Historic District

Other
 Pleasureville, a one-time music alias of Hat Films

See also
 Pleasure Valley (disambiguation)